The George Mason Patriots men's basketball team represents George Mason University (Mason) and competes in the Atlantic 10 Conference of NCAA Division I. The Patriots play at the Patriot Center in Fairfax, Virginia, on the George Mason campus. The following is a list of the program's completed seasons.

Season results

Postseason results

NCAA tournament results
The Patriots have appeared in the NCAA tournament six times. Their combined record is 5–6.

NIT results
The Patriots have appeared in the National Invitation Tournament (NIT) four times. Their combined record is 3–4.

CBI results
The Patriots have appeared in the College Basketball Invitational (CBI) one time. Their record is 4–2.

CIT results
The Patriots have appeared in the CollegeInsider.com Postseason Tournament (CIT) one time. Their record is 0–1.

References

 
George Mason Patriots
George Mason Patriots basketball seasons